Șuici is a commune in the northern Argeș County, Muntenia, Romania. It is composed of six villages: Ianculești, Paltenu, Păuleni, Rudeni, Șuici and Valea Calului.

Șuici commune is situated at approximately 22 km from Curtea de Argeș.

References

Communes in Argeș County
Localities in Muntenia